The University of Aruba (UA) is a public university located in Oranjestad, the capital city of Aruba, a small island country located in the southern Caribbean Sea. The university was established in 1988 as the University of the Netherlands Antilles, and it became an autonomous institution in 2010 after the dissolution of the Netherlands Antilles.

UA provides undergraduate and postgraduate education in four faculties: Law; Accounting, Finance and Marketing; Hospitality and Tourism Management Studies; and Arts and Science.

References

External links
 University of Aruba

 
1988 establishments in Aruba
Educational institutions established in 1988
Oranjestad, Aruba
Universities in Aruba